Daniyal Raheal (in Punjabi and ) is a Pakistani television actor, director and producer.

Career
The son of veteran actress Seemi Raheel and the brother of actress Mehreen Raheel, after graduating in Film, Theatre & Television from the Beaconhouse National University, Lahore, he started his career with acting in a PTV drama by veteran producer Ayub Khawar. 

Raheal rose to fame with playing a supporting role in the critically acclaimed drama serial Dastaan (2010) and a parallel lead in ARY Digital's Silvatein (2013) where he starred opposite Mira Sethi. Raheal also played a lead character in Teri Meri Kahani, which was a commercial hit. 

As a director and producer he has also done some commercials and ad campaigns.

Personal life
On 28 May 2020, Raheal married fellow actress Faryal Mehmood. 

Rumours surrounding their alleged separation began to spread later that year; on 13 December 2020, Mehmood publicly rejected these claims, commenting that she would "like you guys to leave my marriage up to me and @daniyalraheal and focus on issues that are important in your own lives." 

In August 2021, Mehmood announced that she was currently single confirming their separation.

Filmography

Television

Films

References

External links

Living people
1983 births
Pakistani male television actors
Pakistani television directors
Pakistani television producers
Beaconhouse National University alumni